Someshwar Beach (Tulu/Kannada :Someshwara)  is a beach located in Ullal in the city of Mangalore, India.

The name 'Someshwara beach' is derived from the name of Lord Somanatha, whose temple is located on the sea shore dating back centuries.

The beach is more preferred for walking or sunbathing, as the hidden rocks and currents along this stretch of coast make this beach unsuitable for swimming. The sea claims a number of lives every year as unwary swimmers are dragged by the current.

Close to this beach there is a hill called 'Ottinene Hill'. On reaching the top of this hill there are views of Netravati River merging and disappearing in Arabian Sea. There is lush vegetation and number of medicinal plants that are naturally grown on this hill.

Rudra Paadhe 
Someshwara beach is known for large rocks on the beach called Rudra Shile or Rudra Paadhe, Rudra is Lord Shiva and "Shile" or "Paadhe" means rock in Tulu language.

References

Beaches of Mangalore